The Goliath Bone is the 14th entry in the Mike Hammer series by Mickey Spillane.  It was completed by Max Allan Collins, and was first published on October 13, 2008.  The Goliath Bone is one of three almost finished Mike Hammer novels that Spillane entrusted Collins to finish before his death in 2006.

Plot 
Hammer is forced to put off retirement and his marriage to his longtime love and secretary, Velda, after he falls into the middle of an international crisis. Hammer saves a couple of archaeologists from unknown muggers in New York, who turn out to be Al Qaeda agents who believe they possess a thigh bone of the Biblical character Goliath. Hammer now finds himself going against Islamic terrorists, including a 7-foot agent code named "Goliath".

Note 
Several pages into Chapter 11 of 12, Mike Hammer marries Velda Sterling at City Hall.

References

2008 American novels
American crime novels
Novels published posthumously
Houghton Mifflin books
Mike Hammer (character) novels